The Omaha Flames were an PDL franchise that played from 1996 to 1997, folding before the beginning of the 1998 season. They played in Omaha, Nebraska.

References

Sports in Omaha, Nebraska
Defunct soccer clubs in Nebraska
Defunct Premier Development League teams
1996 establishments in Nebraska
1998 disestablishments in Nebraska